Daniel Rees (10 March 1866 – 19 June 1934) was an Australian politician.

He was born in Waratah to miner Daniel Rees and Elizabeth Francis. He grew up in Lithgow and Wallsend and was a miner from the age of twelve. He was a member of the Miners' Union and from 1922 to 1934 general president of the Miners' Federation. He married Elizabeth Syme on 6 September 1888; they had three children. In December 1909, he was fined £100, in default two months imprisonment, for his role in that year's Newcastle coal strike. From 1931 to 1934 he was a Labor member of the New South Wales Legislative Council. Rees died in Leichhardt in 1934.

References

1866 births
1934 deaths
Australian Labor Party members of the Parliament of New South Wales
Members of the New South Wales Legislative Council